Hexenkopf Hill ("Witches Head") is a low mountain in Northampton County, Pennsylvania.

It is a part of the Reading Prong of the Appalachian Mountains.

Toponymy 
Hexenkopf Hill is said to have been a shrine for local Native Americans. Early white settlers believed it to be inhabited by witches.

References 

Mountains of Northampton County, Pennsylvania
Mountains of Pennsylvania